Periodontic may refer to:

Periodontium, the gums and tissues that surround, and structures that support, the teeth 
Periodontics or Periodontology, the specialty of dentistry that studies the periodontium 
periodontal disease, such as periodontitis